Leukotriene-B(4) omega-hydroxylase 1 is an enzyme protein involved in the metabolism of various endogenous substrates (mainly the fatty acids) and xenobiotics (including pharmaceutical drugs). The most notable substrate of the enzyme is leukotriene B4, a potent mediator of inflammation. The CYP4F2 gene encodes the enzyme in humans.

Function 
The Leukotriene-B(4) omega-hydroxylase 1, or simply the CYP4F2 enzyme protein, encoded by CYP4F2 gene in humans, is a member of the cytochrome P450 superfamily of enzymes. The CYP4F2 gene belongs to a cluster of cytochrome P450 genes on chromosome 19. Another member of this family, CYP4F11, is approximately 16 kb away.

The enzyme is called Leukotriene-B(4) omega-hydroxylase 1 because it starts the process of inactivating and degrading leukotriene B4, a potent mediator of inflammation.

The cytochrome P450 enzymes are monooxygenases which catalyze many reactions involved in drug metabolism and synthesis of cholesterol, steroids, fatty acids, and other lipids.

The CYP4F2 enzyme protein presents in endoplasmic reticulum.

The enzyme CYP4F2 is involved in the metabolism of various endogenous substrates, including fatty acids, eicosanoids and vitamins. It controls the bioavailability of Vitamin E. It also controls the bioavailability of Vitamin K, a co-factor required for blood to clot. Variations in the CYP4F2 gene that affect the bioavailability of Vitamin K also affect the dosing of Vitamin K antagonists such as warfarin, coumarin or acenocoumarol. The enzyme also regulates the bioactivation of various drugs, e.g., the anti-malarial drug pafuramidine and the anti-parasitic drug furamidine. It also plays a role in renal water homeostasis.

Inactivation of Leukotriene B4 
Arachidonic acid is a precursor of the eicosanoid molecules that control immune response and inflammation. Acute inflammation on injury or infection protects the body from pathogens. It should also be taken into consideration that if inflammation is continuing for a notably long time, healthy cells and tissues are damaged. Thus, the inflammation must be carefully controlled. Leukotriene B4 is a pro-inflammatory eicosanoid with strong chemoattractant properties. It can be rapidly produced by activated innate immune cells, such as neutrophils, macrophages and mast cells. It induces the activation of polymorphonuclear leukocytes, monocytes and fibroblasts, the production of superoxide and the release of cytokines to attract neutrophils. CYP4F2 starts the process of inactivating and degrading leukotriene B4, by converting it to its ω-hydroxylated metabolite 20-hydroxyleukotriene B4 in human liver microsomes. CYP4F2 then coverts 20-hydroxyleukotriene B4 to 20-oxoleukotriene B4 and then to 20-carboxyleukotrene B4.

Chain shortening 
It is α-, β-, and ω-oxidation of fatty acid carbon chains that degrades the acids, with the preferred pathway being the β-oxidation in the mitochondria and peroxisomes. Very long chain fatty acids cannot be β-oxidized. The number of carbon atoms in the chains of such acids exceeds 22. Such chains must be shortened before being oxidized by mitochondria. The CYP4F2 enzyme is involved in catalyzing the ω-oxidation and chain shortening of such acids.

Metabolism of vitamins 
The enzyme plays an important role in vitamin metabolism by chain shortening.

CYP4F2 is the only known enzyme to ω-hydroxylate tocotrienols and tocopherols (types of Vitamin E), thus making it a key regulator of circulating plasma Vitamin E levels. It catalyzes ω-hydroxylation of the phytyl chain of tocopherols (forms of vitamin E), with preference for gamma-tocopherols over α-tocopherols, thus promoting retention of α-tocopherols in tissues.

Both types of Vitamin K (K1 and K2) can be used as co-factors for γ-glutamyl carboxylase, an enzyme that catalyzes the posttranslational modification of Vitamin K-dependent proteins, thus biochemically activating the proteins involved in blood coagulation and bone mineralization. CYP4F2 ω-xydroxylates and inactivates Vitamin K. As a result, CYP4F2 becomes vital negative regulator of circulating Vitamin K levels.

Production of 20-HETE 
CYP4F2 along with CYP4A22, CYP4A11, CYP4F3 and CYP2U1 also metabolize arachidonic acid to 20-Hydroxyeicosatetraenoic acid (20-HETE) by an ω-oxidation reaction, with the predominant 20-HETE-synthesizing enzymes in humans being CYP4F2, followed by CYP4A11. 20-HETE regulates blood flow, vascularization, blood pressure, and kidney tubule absorption of ions in rodents and possibly humans. The CYP4F2*3 (rs2108622) polymorphism (the enzyme protein with valine residue replaced to methionine residue at position 433) leads to reduced capacity to metabolize arachidonic acid to 20-HETE, but increased urinary excretion of 20-HETE. Researchers have identified at least 3 more single-nucleotide polymorphisms (2024C>G P85A; 80C>T A27V rs771576634; 139C>T R47C rs115517770) which may affect conversion of arachidonic acid to HETE-20.

Metabolism of fatty acids 
Members of the CYP4A and CYP4F sub-families may also ω-hydroxylate and thereby reduce the activity of various fatty acid metabolites of arachidonic acid including leukotriene B4, 5-HETE, 5-oxo-eicosatetraenoic acid, 12-HETE, and several prostaglandins that are involved in regulating various inflammatory, vascular, and other responses in animals and humans. This hydroxylation-induced inactivation may underlie the proposed roles of the cytochromes in dampening inflammatory responses and the reported associations of certain CYP4F2 single-nucleotide polymorphisms (SNPs) with human Crohn's disease and Coeliac disease.

Tye enzyme catalyzes ω-hydroxylation of 3-hydroxy fatty acids. It converts monoepoxides of linoleic acid leukotoxin and isoleukotoxin to ω-hydroxylated metabolites. It also contributes to the degradation of very long-chain fatty acids by catalyzing successive ω-oxidations and chain shortening.

Anti-parasitic drugs
Pafuramidine is a prodrug of furamidine, an antiparasitic drug. There are at least two studies which determined that CYP4F2 is one of the enzymes responsible for the conversion of pafuramidine to furamidine in human liver microsomes and human enteric microsomes.

Genetic variants 
The T allele at rs2108622, which has been designated as CYP4F2*3 in the Human CYP Allele Nomenclature Database by the Pharmacogene Variation Consortium, produces the enzyme with valine residue replaced to methionine residue at position 433, a single-nucleotide polymorphism, resulting in reduced CYP4F2 enzyme activity for some substances, due to decrease in steady-state hepatic concentrations of the enzyme. This polymorphism, CYP4F2*3 (1347C>T; NM_001082.5:c.1297G>A; p. Val433Met; rs2108622), is the most studied and most pharmacogenetically relevant. Another polymorphism, CYP4F2*2 (NM_001082.4:c.34T>G; p.Trp12Gly; rs3093105), increases specific enzyme activity for some substances.

Studies have shown that CYP4F2*3 polymorphism has a role in eicosanoid and Vitamin E metabolism, in the bioavailability of Vitamin K, in affecting doses of warfarin or coumarin, and is also associated with hypertension, with increased risk of cerebral infarction (i.e. ischemic stroke) and myocardial infarction.

Research 
The molecular mediators, inducers, and inhibitors that regulate CYP4F2 expression have mostly been elucidated in in vitro systems:

 There have been findings that retinoic acid (a metabolite of vitamin A1) and saturated fatty acids, such as lauric acid and stearic acid, induce CYP4F2. Besides that, there were findings that lovastatin induce CYP4F2.
 There also have been findings that CYP4F2 is inhibited by peroxisomal proliferators, such as clofibrate, pirinixic acid, nafenopin and tibric acid; the anti-fungal drug ketoconazole, and sesamin - a molecule found in sesame oil and sesame seeds, also inhibit CYP4F2. Another study has shown that quercetin, tranylcypromine, and disulfiram also inhibit CYP4F2.
 A study has found that the following substances do not inhibit CYP4F2: brincidofovir and azoles (except ketoconazole), namely posaconazole, fluconazole, and voriconazole.

With the exception of ketoconazole and sesamin, these findings have not been confirmed in clinical studies. The inhibitory effect of ketoconazole has been confirmed by a study of 21 participants with different CYP4F2*3 variants enrolled (8 for *1/*1, 7 for *1/*3, and 6 for *3/*3). The inhibitory effect of sesamin has been confirmed by a randomized, controlled crossover trial, where 33 overweight men and women consumed 25 grams per day of sesame (approximately 50 mg/d of sesame lignan) for 5 weeks, resulting in a 28% decrease in plasma and a 32% decrease in urinary 20-HETE, while urinary sodium, potassium, and blood pressure were not affected.

References 

Enzymes